The 2000 Speedway Conference League was the third tier/division of British speedway.

Summary
The title was won by Sheffield Prowlers, the junior club belonging to the Sheffield Tigers.

Final league table

Conference League Knockout Cup
The 2000 Conference League Knockout Cup was the third edition of the Knockout Cup for tier three teams. Boston Barracudas were the winners.

Semi-finals

Final

Other Honours
League Cup final - Mildenhall Fen Tigers 97 Somerset Rebels 80
Conference League Riders' Championship - Scott Pegler (Newport)

See also
List of United Kingdom Speedway League Champions

References

Conference
Speedway Conference League